Krakow is an unincorporated community in Nance County, Nebraska, in the United States.

History
A large share of the early settlers being natives of Poland caused the name Krakow to be selected.

References

Unincorporated communities in Nance County, Nebraska
Unincorporated communities in Nebraska